Obesotoma gigantea is a species of sea snail, a marine gastropod mollusk in the family Mangeliidae.

Description
The length varies between 12 mm and 25 mm. It differs from Obesotoma gigas  (Verkrüzen, 1875) in a more produced, curved siphonal canal.

Distribution
This marine species is found from Eastern Greenland to Severnaya Zemlya, Russia

References

 Morch, O.A.L. (1869) Catalogue des mollusques du Spitzberg, recueilles par le Dr. H. Kroyer pendant le voyage de la corvette la Recherche en juin 1838. Memoires de la Societe Malacologique de Belgique, 4: 7–32
 Kantor, Y.I. & Sysoev, A.V. (eds), 2005. Catalogue of molluscs of Russia and adjacent countries. Moscow

External links
  Tucker, J.K. 2004 Catalog of recent and fossil turrids (Mollusca: Gastropoda). Zootaxa 682:1–1295.

gigantea
Gastropods described in 1869